The following is a list of characters who appear in The Angry Birds Movie and The Angry Birds Movie 2.

Birds
In the films, the Birds, who are the primary protagonists in the franchise, live on an island known as Bird Island, which ignores various Angry Birds media that some of the Birds live on Piggy Island or Golden Island, though the films are likely set before the game.

 Red (voiced by Jason Sudeikis, Aidan McGraw and Kallan Holley  (young)) is a red cardinal and the protector of Bird Island. He used to have anger issues, which declined drastically after he attended anger management class in the first film.
 Chuck, (voiced by Josh Gad) a canary, is the fastest citizen in Bird Island, but constantly gets a speeding ticket whenever he goes too fast.
 Bomb (voiced by Danny McBride, Suzanne Walters as opera voice) is a very gentle and kind bird. He is very sincere and genuine in his actions and is willing to put himself in conflict or danger to help out the other birds in his flock. When he gets startled, he explodes like a bomb (hence his name).
 Silver (voiced by Rachel Bloom) is Chuck's younger sister who attends Avian Academy and helps defeat Zeta from destroying both Bird and Piggy Island. She later becomes Red's girlfriend.
 Matilda (voiced by Maya Rudolph) is an artist and the anger management teacher on Bird Island.
 Terence (voiced by Sean Penn in first film, Nolan North as singing voice, later replacement in second film) is a large red bird who only speaks in grunts.  
 Judge Peckinpah (voiced by Keegan-Michael Key) is the judge on Bird Island. He is an owl who is standing on another bird to hide his true size.
 Cyrus (voiced by Tony Hale)
 Stella (voiced by Kate McKinnon) is an eternally optimistic and intelligent pink bird. Thanks to her inquisitive nature, she has become one of the leading experts on Bird Island. Kate McKinnon was originally going to reprise her role as Stella in The Angry Birds Movie 2, but busy to reprise the voice role for unknown reasons.
 Hal (voiced by Anthony Padilla) is likely the least consistent in personality out of any of the characters. At times, he is shown to be an elderly, knowledgeable and respected bird who is peaceful and friendly, and at other times he is shown to be a very goofy, silly bird.
 Bubbles (voiced by Ian Hecox) is a bird who is best friends with Hal. Bubbles can inflate to defeat pigs.
 Edward (voiced by Hannibal Buress)
 Eva (voiced by Jane Lynch)
 Willow (voiced by Charli XCX) is very artistic and loves to daydream. She has grand ideas but cannot always follow through on them.
 Poppy
 Rozzie
 Dahlia (originally going to be voiced by Camille Hyde, but busy to voice the character for unknown reasons)
 Gale (originally going to be voiced by Nicole Sullivan, but busy to voice the character for unknown reasons)
 Val

Kid Birds
 Ella Bird (voiced by McKenna Grace) is a kid bird who called Red eyebrows.
 Maya Bird (voiced by Bella Laudiero) is one of Red's childhood counterparts during The Angry Birds Movie.
 Arianna Bird (voiced by Malena Brewer) is a daughter of Sophie Bird and Clayton the Waiter Bird.
 Bobby Bird (voiced by Max Charles) is a son of Helene and he has a younger sister and a younger brother.
 Anders (voiced by Kaci Simotas) is a daughter of the Grumpy Dad from The Angry Birds Movie 2.
 Scott (voiced by Asher Bishop) is a kid bird who was a part of the crowds.

Hatchlings
 The Blues are a group of blue hatchlings.
 Jay (voiced by Noah Schnapp in The Angry Birds Movie, JoJo Siwa in The Angry Birds Movie 2) is the "leader" of the group, who always seems to put some plans into action but also seems to have a bit of a crush on Samantha.
 Jim
 Jake
 Dylan (voiced by Vincent Oswald) is Timothy's younger brother who was prematurely born by Red when he accidentally landed on his egg.
 Samantha (Sam-Sam) (voiced by Samantha Cohen in The Angry Birds Movie and Alma Versano in The Angry Birds Movie 2)
 Will
 Stephen 
 Marky
 Jimmy
 Rob
 Timothy (voiced by Ava Acres) is Dylan's older brother.
 Zoe (voiced by Brooklynn Prince) is the eldest child of Terence and Matilda.
 Vincent (ViVi) (voiced by Genesis Tennon) is a bird who loves to play soccer and play with his friends, he is also clueless, being fooled by Jay, Jake, and Jim often. He is also smart, as seen in some circumstances.
 Beatrice (voiced by Faith Margaret Kidman-Urban)
 Lily (voiced by Sunday Rose Kidman-Urban)
 Hazel (voiced by Hazel Van Orman)
 Leif Van Orman (voiced by Leif Van Orman)
 Ally (voiced by Nova Reed) is a Hatchling who replaces Ella Bird from The Angry Birds Movie for The Angry Birds Movie 2.
 Jenny (voiced by Samantha Cohen)
 Bailey (voiced by Eliza Cohen)

Pigs
 King Leonard Mudbeard (voiced by Bill Hader) is the king of Piggy Island.
 Courtney (voiced by Awkwafina) is a quiet teenager pig who enjoys texting and listening to music on her phone.
 Ross (voiced by Tony Hale) is King Pig's assistant in the first movie.
 Garry (voiced by Sterling K. Brown) seems to be one of the smartest pigs of them all. He is great at inventing tools, such as Invisi-Spray and other crazy inventions. He is a good friend of Leonard, helping him and the birds. He is very serious and speaks with a British accent.
 Earl (voiced by Blake Shelton) is a pig who wears a cowboy hat and has a southern accent. He also likes country music and has the ability to sing.
 Photog (voiced by Tituss Burgess) is a pig who works as a photographer.
 Corporal Pig (originally going to be voiced by Gerald Urquhart, but busy to voice the character for unknown reasons)
 Foreman Pig (voiced by Fergal Reilly) is the chief of construction on Piggy Island, usually ordering his workers to build things at Pig City.
 Bubba (voiced by Gaten Matarazzo) is a member of the SQUEAL Team Six and/or a hungry pig who asked for hot sauce during the Prank Wars but the hot sauce hit him.
 Monty Pig (voiced by Fred Tatasciore) is a pig who looks very identical to Corporal Pig in his old design from Angry Birds Toons, but with a lollipop on his helmet. His name is a reference to a Monty Mole in the Mario series.
 Rodney Pig (voiced by Matt McCarthy) is Monty Pig's partner, he resembles classic Corporal Pig from Angry Birds.
 Hamilton Pig (voiced by Maddie Taylor) is Earl's 1st brother and Earl's only sibling to be credited for The Angry Birds Movie.

Piglets
 Isla (voiced by Sunday Rose Kidman-Urban)
 Sophie (voiced by Faith Margaret Kidman-Urban)
 Oliver (voiced by Mason Ramsey)
 Rox
 Joey
 Emily
 Penny
 Totty
 Bronzy

Eagles
 Mighty Eagle (voiced by Peter Dinklage) is an legendary eagle.
 Zeta (voiced by Leslie Jones) is the leader of Eagle Island.
 Debbie (voiced by Tiffany Haddish) is the daughter of Mighty Eagle and Zeta.
 Glenn (voiced by Eugenio Derbez) is Eagle Island's top scientist.
 Carl (voiced by Zach Woods) is an eagle who works for Zeta. 
 Jerry (voiced by Pete Davidson) is an eagle who works for Zeta. 
 Brad Eagleburger (voiced by Beck Bennett) is a high-ranking security guard who works for Zeta.
 Axel (voiced by David Dobrik) is one of the security guards who works for Zeta.
 Kira (voiced by JoJo Siwa) is a security guard who works for Zeta.
 Hank (voiced by Beck Bennett) is a security guard who works for Zeta. He is very serious about his job.

Others
 The worms are a group of worms who are eaten by the birds.
 Billy the Sign (voiced by Catherine Winder) is a mechanical bird who serves as the mascot for Matilda's Anger Management Class.
 Eagle Detector (voiced by John Cohen)
 Mother Snake (voice by Grey Griffin) is a snake.
 Eloise (voiced by Isla Andrews) is a snakelet with blue eyes.

References

Angry Birds